Moïse Brou Apanga (4 February 1982 – 26 April 2017) was a professional footballer who played as a centre back. Born in the Ivory Coast, he represented Gabon at international level.

International career
Brou Apanga represented his country at the 2012 African Cup of Nations, during which Gabon, as hosts of the competition, reached the quarter-finals.

Death
Brou Apanga died in April 2017, having suffered a heart attack while training with his club side FC 105 Libreville.

References

External links
 

1982 births
2017 deaths
Footballers from Abidjan
Association football central defenders
Gabonese footballers
Gabon international footballers
Ivorian footballers
Gabonese people of Ivorian descent
2010 Africa Cup of Nations players
Ivorian expatriate footballers
Expatriate footballers in Romania
Ivorian expatriate sportspeople in Romania
Expatriate footballers in France
FC Politehnica Timișoara players
Stade Brestois 29 players
Ligue 1 players
Ligue 2 players
2012 Africa Cup of Nations players
Association football players who died while playing
Sport deaths in Gabon
21st-century Gabonese people